The 1970–71 season was Stoke City's 64th season in the Football League and the 40th in the First Division.

Stoke had a successful season making it to the semi-final of the FA Cup for only the second time in their history. Stoke made it through seven matches before facing Arsenal, where after building a 2–0 lead at Hillsborough Stoke let slip in the final few minutes and Arsenal levelled at 2–2. In the replay the "Gunners" won 2–0 at Villa Park. In the league Stoke finished in a mid-table position of 13th with 37 points, Stoke did record a famous win over Arsenal beating the eventual league champions 5–0 in September.

Season review

League
Stoke had a good opening spell to the 1970–71 season, losing just three of their first 12 matches one of which was a crushing 5–2 defeat at Midlands rivals West Bromwich Albion. But generally the defence looked strong and solid and indeed six clean sheets were kept during that period. Stoke's sixth home game of the season on 26 September was against Bertie Mee's impressive Arsenal side at the Victoria Ground. Because of local travel difficulties (bus driver strike) just over 18,000 fans saw the match and those lucky enough to be there watch one of the best performances by a Stoke City side.

Arsenal, who would go on to become First Division and FA Cup winners were well beaten 5–0 by Stoke in front of the Match of the Day cameras. As the season wore on Stoke found it difficult to maintain a consistent run of form in the First Division and their attentions soon turned towards the FA Cup. With the cup a distraction Stoke did well to finish in a mid table position of 13th.

FA Cup
After Christmas Stoke became heavily involved in the FA Cup and they came very close to making it to their first final. Revenge was gained over Millwall in the third round and then Huddersfield Town proved to be difficult to get the better of, the tie finally being decided in a second replay at Old Trafford, Stoke winning 1–0 thanks to a goal from Jimmy Greenhoff. In the fifth round Stoke met Ipswich Town and after a goalless draw, Denis Smith scoring the only goal at Portman Road to send Stoke through to face Hull City in the quarter final. The tie at Boothferry Park was a cracking encounter with Stoke winning 3–2 to claim a place in the semi final for the first time since 1899, 75 years ago.

Their opponents in the semi final were Arsenal with the tie played at Hillsborough Stadium in Sheffield. Stoke produced a dominant first half display and went into the half time break 2–0 up, with Smith and Ritchie scoring the goals that sent Stoke supporters ecstatic. Alas it was not to be as Arsenal clawed their way back into the match thanks to two second half goals from Peter Storey with the last being a penalty in the last minute of the game. Stoke were left to rue only scoring two goals in their first half dominance as the "Gunners" earned a replay they hardly deserved. Villa Park was the venue for 'part two' of the contest and in front of 62,356, Arsenal comfortably won 2–0 and went on to lift the trophy and complete a domestic double alongside their First Division league title. On the eve of the final, Stoke won the third place play off against Everton 3–2.

League Cup
Millwall knocked Stoke out of the League Cup 2–1 in the second round.

Final league table

Results

Stoke's score comes first

Legend

Football League First Division

FA Cup

League Cup

Texaco Cup

Anglo-Italian Cup

Friendlies

Squad statistics

References

Stoke City F.C. seasons
Stoke